Elections to the French National Assembly were held in Gabon and French Congo on 17 June 1951.

Results

First college

Second college: Gabon

Second College: Moyen Congo

References

Gabon
Elections in Gabon
Elections in the Republic of the Congo
1951 in Gabon
1951 in Moyen-Congo
Election and referendum articles with incomplete results